JeQuan Lewis (born September 4, 1994) is an American professional basketball player for Rostock Seawolves of Basketball Bundesliga. He played college basketball for VCU.

High school career
Lewis attended Davidson Academy as a freshman starting at quarterback as a true freshman for the defending state champions before transferring to Dickson County High School in Tennessee, where he played both basketball and football. His prowess at quarterback led to a scholarship offer from Marshall. However, Lewis was persuaded to stick to basketball and committed to VCU after then-assistant coach Will Wade recruited him.

College career
Lewis came off the bench as a freshman at VCU and averaged 5.9 points and 2.0 assists per game. He was a part-time starter as a sophomore and averaged 8.5 points and 2.7 assists per game. As a junior he started all but two games and averaged 11.3 points and 5.1 assists per game. Coming into his senior season, Lewis was named to the preseason Third  Team All-Atlantic 10. Lewis averaged 15.2 points and 4.5 assists per game as a senior, shooting 36.7 percent from beyond the three-point arc. He was named to the First Team All-Atlantic 10. He scored 30 points in his final game, an 85–77 loss to St. Mary's in the NCAA Tournament. He finished his VCU career with 1,444 points and ranks sixth all-time at the school in assists (505), eighth in career made 3-pointers (189) and sixth in made free throws (341).

Professional career
After graduating from VCU, Lewis signed with the Milwaukee Bucks of the NBA Summer League. He was not signed by the Bucks to a regular season contract but was instead assigned to their G League affiliate the Wisconsin Herd. Lewis scored 32 points and added five rebounds, four assists and three steals in a loss to the Long Island Nets on February 11, 2018. In his rookie year, Lewis started 16 of 49 games, averaging 9.2 points, 4.5 assists, 2.3 rebounds and 1.5 steals per game.

He began the 2018–19 season with Goyang Orions of the Korean Basketball League. On December 2, 2018, Lewis joined Kymi of the Greek Basket League. He averaged 16.1 points, 2.2 rebounds, 5.7 assists and 1.4 steals per game over 16 games with Kymis. On August 28, 2019, Lewis signed with PAOK Thessaloniki and remained in Greece. Lewis averaged 9.5 points and 5.3 assists per game. He was eventually replaced by Bobby Brown in early January 2020. Lewis subsequently joined Ramat HaSharon and averaged 17.8 points and 6.5 assists per game. On August 2, 2021, he signed with Kalev/Cramo of VTB United League. On January 20, 2022, JeQuan parted ways with the team.
On July 22, 2022, he signed with Rostock Seawolves of the German Basketball Bundesliga.

References

External links
 JeQuan Lewis at NBA D-League
 VCU Rams bio

1994 births
Living people
American expatriate basketball people in Estonia
American expatriate basketball people in Greece
American expatriate basketball people in Israel
American expatriate basketball people in South Korea
American men's basketball players
Basketball players from Tennessee
BC Kalev/Cramo players
Goyang Carrot Jumpers players
Kymis B.C. players
P.A.O.K. BC players
People from Dickson, Tennessee
Point guards
Rostock Seawolves players
VCU Rams men's basketball players
Wisconsin Herd players